The June Sandidge House is a historic house at 811 Cherry Street in Gurdon, Arkansas.  It is a single-story wood-frame house with a brick veneer exterior, and represents an excellent and unusual local example of English Revival architecture.  The house was built in 1938 by Mr. June Sandidge, an engineer for the Missouri Pacific Railroad.  Its styling is essentially vernacular English Revival, although there are some Mediterranean influences, including Spanish-style arches on the porch.

The house was listed on the National Register of Historic Places in 1993.

See also
National Register of Historic Places listings in Clark County, Arkansas

References

Houses on the National Register of Historic Places in Arkansas
Houses completed in 1935
Houses in Clark County, Arkansas
National Register of Historic Places in Clark County, Arkansas